Closer to the Truth is a 1991 album by American singer-songwriter Tony Joe White. The album marked White's return to recording, after years working solely as a songwriter. The songs "Steamy Windows" and "Undercover Agent for the Blues" were originally written for Tina Turner, and were previously recorded by her for her album Foreign Affair, featuring White on guitar.

The album sold more than 250,000 copies in Europe and Australia.

Critical reception
The Courier-Mail wrote that the album "has several stand-out tracks including 'Tunica Motel,' 'The Other Side,' 'Cool Town Woman' and 'Bare Necessities.'"

Track listing
All songs by Tony Joe White except as indicated.
 "Tunica Motel" – 4:17
 "Ain't Going Down This Time" – 5:06
 "Steamy Windows" – 3:54
 "(You're Gonna Look) Good in Blues" – 5:10
 "Love M.D." (Leann White, Tony Joe White) – 3:34 
 "The Other Side" – 5:50
 "Bi-Yo Rhythm" – 5:15
 "Cool Town Woman" – 4:16
 "Bare Necessities" – 3:47
 "Undercover Agent for the Blues" (Leann White, Tony Joe White) – 4:44 
 "Main Squeeze" – 4:16
 "Closer to the Truth" (Leann White, Tony Joe White) – 6:33

Personnel

Band members
 Tony Joe White – guitars, harmonica, whomper, swamp box
 David Hood – bass guitar
 Roger Hawkins – drums
 Steve Nathan – keyboards
 Spooner Oldham – Wurlitzer piano
 Harvey Thompson – horns
 Mickey Buckins – percussion

Production
 Chris Lord-Alge – mixing
 Steve Melton – engineering
 Leann White – photography
 Glenn Sakamoto – package design

Charts

References

1991 albums
Tony Joe White albums